Thliptoceras cascalis is a moth in the family Crambidae. It was described by Charles Swinhoe in 1890. It is found in the Indian state of Sikkim and in Myanmar.

References

Moths described in 1890
Pyraustinae